Norman Crowther Hunt, Baron Crowther-Hunt (13 March 1920 – 16 February 1987) was a British scholar and Labour politician. He served as a Minister of State in Harold Wilson's 1974–1976 government, and became Rector of Exeter College, Oxford in 1982.

Early life and education
Hunt was born in Bradford in 1920. He was educated at Belle Vue High School in Bradford, and studied history at Sidney Sussex College, Cambridge before becoming a research fellow there in 1949. He gained a Commonwealth Fund Fellowship studied American politics at Princeton University and in 1952, he was elected to a tutorial fellowship in politics at Exeter College, Oxford.

Career
Hunt appeared regularly on BBC television and radio, and hosted the weekly People and Politics on the BBC World Service. In 1986, his work with the corporation lead to his appointment as chairman of its General Advisory Council.

Through his friendship with Harold Wilson, Hunt was able to promote reform of the civil service and devolution, two issues on which he felt deeply. During Wilson's first term as Prime Minister, he served on the Committee on the Civil Service (1966–1968; chaired by Lord Fulton), and was appointed to the Royal Commission on the Constitution, chaired by Lord Crowther and later Lord Kilbrandon, in 1969.

On 9 July 1973, he was awarded a life peerage as Baron Crowther-Hunt, of Eccleshill in the West Riding of the County of York.

To develop the government's devolution proposals following Wilson's return to power, Crowther-Hunt became a constitutional adviser to the government from March to October 1974. He then served as Minister of State, Education and Science until 1976, when he became Minister of State for the Privy Council Office, when he again dealt with devolution issues.

Disillusioned by the government's narrow, party-political attitude to devolution and obstructions to civil service reform, he returned to full-time teaching at Exeter College in 1976. He became Rector in 1982, a position in which he served until his death from a heart attack in 1987.

Footnotes

References
  

1920 births
1987 deaths
Politicians from Bradford
Labour Party (UK) life peers
Rectors of Exeter College, Oxford
Alumni of Sidney Sussex College, Cambridge
Fellows of Sidney Sussex College, Cambridge
Princeton University alumni
Fellows of Exeter College, Oxford
Harkness Fellows
People educated at Belle Vue Boys' Grammar School, Bradford
Life peers created by Elizabeth II